Luigi Viale (born 5 November 1978) is an Italian former yacht racer who competed in the 2008 Summer Olympics.

References

External links
 
 
 

1978 births
Living people
Italian male sailors (sport)
Olympic sailors of Italy
Sailors at the 2008 Summer Olympics – Star
Place of birth missing (living people)